Aholming is a municipality in the district of Deggendorf, Germany.

Near Aholming there formerly was a long wave transmitter (owned by Media Broadcast until its dismantling) for transmitting the programs of Deutschlandfunk.

References

Deggendorf (district)